Chabacano metro station is a Mexico City Metro transfer station in the Cuauhtémoc borough of Mexico City. It is served by Lines 2 (the Blue Line), 8 (the Green Line) and 9 (the Brown Line). It is a combined underground and at-grade station whose platforms are distributed into two side platforms and one island platform—the Spanish solution layout.

Chabacano metro station is located between San Antonio Abad and Viaducto stations on Line 2, between Obrera and La Viga stations on Line 8, and between Lázaro Cárdenas and Jamaica stations on Line 9. It serves the colonias (neighborhoods) of Ampliación Asturias, Obrera, and Vista Alegre. The station's pictogram depicts an apricot and it was named after a previously existing street that had multiple apricot trees.

Chabacano metro station opened on 1 August 1970 with service on Line 2 northward toward Pino Suárez metro station and southward toward Tasqueña station. Southeasterly service on Line 8 toward Constitución de 1917 station and northward toward Garibaldi station began on 20 July 1994. Line 9's west–east service from Centro Médico to Pantitlán stations started on 26 August 1987. The station serving Line 2 had to be rebuilt when the transfer stations were built.

The station facilities are accessible for people with disabilities as there are elevators, escalators and access ramps; inside, there is an Internet café, an information desk, a cultural showcase, a private library, and a mural titled Civilización y Cultura by José de Guimarães. The station also served as a film location for the 1990 film Total Recall, starring Arnold Schwarzenegger, and Javier Álvarez named a composition after the station. In 2019, the station had an overall average daily entrance of 43,617 passengers.

Location

Chabacano is a metro transfer station in the Cuauhtémoc borough, in central Mexico City. The Line 2 station lies along Calzada de Tlalpan, the Line 8 station lies below Juan A. Mateos Street, near Calzada de Tlalpan, and the Line 9 station lies below Eje 3 Sur, José Peón Contreras Avenue. Chabacano station serves the colonias (Mexican Spanish for "neighborhoods") of Ampliación Asturias, Obrera, and Vista Alegre. Within the system, it lies between San Antonio Abad and Viaducto stations on Line 2, between Obrera and La Viga stations on Line 8, and between Lázaro Cárdenas and Jamaica stations on Line 9.

Chabacano metro station is serviced by Routes 2-A, 31-B, 33, 111-A, and 145-A of the Red de Transporte de Pasajeros (RTP) system and by Routes 9-C, 9-E, 14-A, 17-C, 17-H, and 17-I of the public bus system.

Exits
There are nine exits:
East: Between Juan A. Mateos Street, Calzada Chabacano and San Antonio Abad Avenue, Vista Alegre (Line 2).
West: Between Manuel Caballero Street, Antonio Solís Street and San Antonio Abad Avenue, Obrera (Line 2).
North: Juan A. Mateos Street and Vicente Beristain Street, Vista Alegre (Line 8).
Southeast: Juan A. Mateos Street and Vicente Beristain Street, Vista Alegre (Line 8).
Southwest: Juan A. Mateos Street and Vicente Beristain Street, Vista Alegre (Line 8).
Northeast: Calzada Chabacano and J. Antonio Torres X Street, Vista Alegre (Line 9).
Southeast: Calzada Chabacano and J. Antonio Torres X Street, Vista Alegre (Line 9).
Northwest: Calzada Chabacano and Francisco Ayala Street, Ampliación Asturias (Line 9).
Southwest: Calzada Chabacano and Francisco Ayala Street, Ampliación Asturias (Line 9).

History and construction

Line 2 of the Mexico City Metro was built by Ingeniería de Sistemas de Transportes Metropolitano, Electrometro and Cometro, the latter a subsidiary of Empresas ICA. Chabacano Line 2 station opened on 1 August 1970, on the first day of the Pino Suárez–Tasqueña service. The station was built at-grade level with a station design similar to those of the other stations in the at-grade section, including an island platform. When the construction of Lines 8 and 9 began, it was decided to rebuild the station to facilitate passenger boarding and deboarding. It was decided to use the system known as the Spanish solution on all its platforms, in which incoming passengers leave the train through the central platform, then commuters waiting in the station board on the opposite side of the train on the side platforms.

Line 8 was built by ICA and its first and only section opened on 20 July 1994, operating from Garibaldi to Constitución de 1917 stations. Line 9 was built by Cometro and its first section was opened on 26 August 1987, operating from Centro Médico towards Pantitlán station. Unlike other transfer stations in the system with an underground-street-level configuration, where a tunnel usually connects them, the transfer passageway for Lines 2 and 9 is elevated because there was no space to make a tunnel between both stations. Commuters that use Line 8 need to use two additional sets of stairs that connect to a tunnel that runs between Francisco Ayala Street and Vicente Beristain Street.

Chabacano metro station has a disabled-accessible service with access ramps, six elevators on Lines 2 and 9 as well as escalators on Line 9 – these were renovated in 2021 due to their obsolescence. The station's pictogram features the silhouette of an apricot in reference to its name, which references a previously existing street that had multiple apricot trees. The use of the word  to refer to the fruit is limited to Mexican Spanish; elsewhere, the word means "tacky" and "vulgar".

Landmarks, cultural events and popular culture

Due to the size of Chabacano metro station, the system allows the exhibition of cultural programs in its lobby. The station has hosted mini-concerts featuring musicians such as Trans-X, Ji-Hae Park or the Orquesta Sinfónica de Yucatán. Inside the station, there is an Internet café, an information desk, a cultural showcase, a private library, and a mural titled Civilización y Cultura (English: "Culture and Civilization") by Portuguese artist José de Guimarães. It is located on Line 9 and was inaugurated on 6 November 1996. The mural features elements of the pre-Hispanic cultures of Mesoamerica. According to de Guimarães "two fundamental archetypes have prevailed throughout the centuries [in pre-Hispanic Mexican culture]: the serpent as a symbol of water-life and the jaguar as a symbol of earth-fertility. Without these two important elements for man, history would not take place".

Javier Álvarez, a Mexican composer, named one of his compositions after the metro station. Álvarez first created "Canción de tierra y esperanza" (English: "Song of Earth and Hope"), which he dedicated to his parents for Christmas 1986. In 1990, the metro system allowed Marco Límenes, a Mexican artist, to exhibit his kinetic sculptures in the station. Límenes asked Álvarez to use the composition during the exhibition. Álvarez, instead, recomposed the work and renamed it "Metro Chabacano". He requested the Cuarteto Latinoamericano to play and record it. The composition is a string quartet that has an average tempo of 144 to 146 beats per minute. According to Álvarez, it has "a continuous eight-note movement of moderately driving speed from which short melodic solos emerge for each instrument [...] although the piece is brief and in single movement, the rhythms, accents and melodic fragments that emerge from the perpetual motion background are intricately playful". Jacques Sagot wrote for La Nación that the composition converges with the pace of the station, at first with an "uninterrupted flow of repeated notes" and then with "whistles of the violin [evoking] the braking of the machine, the squeaking of the rubber [with] the arrival of the metro train". The Cuarteto Latinoamericano played the composition live at the inauguration of the exhibition in September 1991 and Álvarez subsequently adopted it as a string orchestra composition.

Scenes from the 1990 film Total Recall were shot at night on location at the station. The film stars Arnold Schwarzenegger and is set in 2084, a time in which humankind has colonized Mars. In one of his scenes on Earth, Douglas Quaid, a secret agent whose memory has been erased, flees from people trying to kill him. Quaid enters a subway station and manages to escape by jumping through the window of an outbound train. Schwarzenegger cut his wrist during the scene because the film crew did not explode the window in time. The crew painted the station walls and a train in cement gray, covered the signage and added monitors in different areas.

By 2020, the station and surrounding area became a popular location for the purchase and sale of used and vintage clothing, particularly on weekends.

Incidents
On 28 December 2010, an elderly passenger who tried to help two others who had dropped items onto the tracks fell onto the tracks himself and was killed by an approaching train on Line 2. On 4 June 2018, a law student was arrested for attempting to make use of the library Benito Juárez located inside the station. The manager denied him access and informed him that its use was limited to metro system personnel. When he was referred to the public prosecutor's office, they refused to charge him as they considered it unjustified to prohibit him from using the facilities in accordance with the City Libraries Code since it was located in a public space. System authorities informed that the library is open to the general public upon registration.

The station was vandalized on 12 September 2020 by feminists for reported cases of harassment and for not being allowed to hawk inside the system stations. After the collapse of a bridge on Line 12, where 26 people died, feminists again vandalized the station and assaulted the Metro staff, who they held responsible for the event. On 1 April 2022, a woman slipped off an escalator and knocked down seven others, all reported with minor injuries.

Ridership
According to the data provided by the authorities since the 2000s, accesses on Line 2 are more frequent than on Lines 8 and 9, which are among the least used stations of the system. In 2019, before the impact of the COVID-19 pandemic on public transport, the station's ridership totaled 15,920,404 passengers, which was an increase of 496,341 passengers compared to 2018.

In 2019, for Line 2, the ridership was 10,452,786 passengers (28,637 per day), which was a decrease of 378,369 passengers compared to 2018. For Line 8, the station had a ridership of 1,554,977 passengers (4,260 per day), which was a decrease of 16,068 passengers compared to the previous year. For Line 9, the ridership was 3,912,641 passengers (10,719 per day), which was a decrease of 101,904 passengers compared to 2018. By December 2021, system officials estimated that 83,000 users transited on average through the station.

In the same year, when counted separately, the Line 2 station was the 47th busiest of the system (out of 195 stations) and the line's 9th busiest. The Line 8 station was the 191st busiest in the system and the line's least used. The Line 9 station was the 150th busiest in the system and it was also the line's third-least used.

Notes

References

External links

1987 establishments in Mexico
1970 establishments in Mexico
1994 establishments in Mexico
Accessible Mexico City Metro stations
Mexico City Metro Line 2 stations
Mexico City Metro Line 8 stations
Mexico City Metro Line 9 stations
Mexico City Metro stations in Cuauhtémoc, Mexico City
Railway stations located underground in Mexico
Railway stations opened in 1970
Railway stations opened in 1987
Railway stations opened in 1994
Rebuilt buildings and structures